Chilly was a German Euro disco/rock band from 1978 to 1983. They were created and produced by the producer, composer and book author Bernt Möhrle. Their first album "For your Love" included a suite 11:50 (long version) of the song "For Your Love", new recorded with an arrangement by Christian Kolonovits and Bernt Möhrle. The original "For Your Love" was a Yardbirds hit with the beat of 1965, written by Graham Gouldman. Bernt Möhrle added new lyrics and composed additional music to the arrangement "I Walk alone" and the suite became a great international disco hit. Most famous songs include hits like "Friday On My Mind", "Johnny Loves Jenny", "Come to L.A.", "Simply a Love Song", "Secret Lies", "Come Lets Go", "We Are The Popkings", "Get Up And Move", "Oh I Love You" "For Your Love Ibiza Megamix","Goo Goo Eyes".

Bernt Möhrle created with "For Your Love" a new standard in Disco music in the late 70s and early 80s. It remained on the Billboard dance club songs charts for 7 weeks peaking at number 38 in April 1979. His version was used and remixed among others by DJ Hell on the album Munich Machine. It was also re-released in 2006 by the French label D-Classics in an edited version called "4 Love" made by Dylan Petit and in 2011 by Chocolate Puma feat. Colonel Red
The members of Chilly were Brad Howell: singer, Ute Weber: singer, Werner Suedhoff: dancer, Andrea Linz: dancer, Sofia Ejango: dancer, Oscar Pearson: dancer.

Discography 
For Your Love (1978)
 For Your Love And For Love Suite
 Better Stop
 Dance With Me
 C'mon Baby
 Key Of Love
 Sensation
 Love Love Love

Come to L.A. (1979)
 Sunshine Of Your Love
 Heartattack In My Cadillac
 Sacrifice
 Come To L.A.
 Get Up And Move
 Layla
 Springtime
 Friday On My Mind
 Have Some Fun Tonight

Showbiz (1980)
 There's No Business Like Showbusiness
 Showbiz
 Rock'n Roll Sally
 Taxman
 Come Let's Go
 The Race
 Thank You
 Days
 Two Wrongs Don't Make A Right
 We Are The Popkings
 I Hear You Knocking
 Gotta Move On
 When The Lights Go Down

Secret Lies (1982)
 Dimension 5
 Secret Lies
 Ten Million Dollar Baby
 Brain Storming
 Doll Queen
 Stars
 Simply A Love Song
 Play Me A Classic Symphony
 The Sun Ain't Gonna Shine Anymore
 Runaround
 Energy
 Hide

Devil's Dance (1983)
 For Your Love Techno
 One Moment One Second
 Peep Peep
 Love On The Rebound
 Portable Movement
 Soulflashback
 Goo Goo Eyes
 Jambo Africa
 Man From The East
 Cant We Talk It Over
 Devil's Dance
 Johnny Loves Jenny
 Rosi Rice

References

External links
[ Allmusic.com Chilly]

Eurodisco groups
German musical groups
Hansa Records artists